Polyuridylation, also called oligouridylation, is the addition of several uridine nucleotides to the 3' end of an RNA. One group of RNAs that can be polyuridylated are histone mRNAs that lack a poly(A) tail. Polyuridylation of a histone mRNA promotes its degradation, involving the exosome. Other RNAs in Arabidopsis and mouse have been seen to be polyuridinylated after cleavage.

References

RNA